Centaurea salicifolia is a species of Centaurea found in the Eastern Mediterranean and the Iberian Peninsula. .

References

External links

salicifolia